HRH The Prince of Wales Institute of Engineering and Technology is a technical institute of Assam, and was established in 1927 by the British Government. It is the first engineering institute established in India's North Eastern Region.

History
The Institute was established in 1927 with a financial aid from Assamese timber merchant Bholanath Boruah, that was given to British Government in 1922 for establishing a technical school in the name of the 'Prince of Wales' at Jorhat. The institute was founded the following year on 16 January 1928.  A four-year certificate course in civil engineering was introduced in 1948. Since 1957, three-year diploma courses have been introduced in the Electrical and Mechanical Engineering Departments in addition to the Civil Engineering Department. In 1976 & 1978 respectively, courses in automotive and agricultural engineering began. Electronic & telecommunications engineering and instrumentation technology programs were later introduced in 1986.
The Institution was known as the 'War Technical School' during the time of the Second World War.

Academic
The Institute offers three-year diploma courses in civil engineering,
electrical engineering,
mechanical engineering,
agricultural engineering,
Mechanical(Automobile) engineering ,
electronics & telecommunications engineering and
instrumentation engineering. All courses are affiliated to the State Council of Technical Education, Assam under the Director of Technical Education, Assam. Admission to these courses is based on the Polytechnic Admission Test (PAT) conducted by the Director of Technical Education, Assam.

Departments
 Department of Civil Engineering
 Department of Electrical Engineering
 Department of Mechanical Engineering
 Department of Agricultural Engineering
 Department of Mechanical (Automobile) Engineering
 Department of Electronics & Telecommunications Engineering
 Department of Instrumentation Engineering
 Department of Physics
 Department of Chemistry
 Department of Mathematics
 Department of Humanities
 Workshop Departments

References 

Engineering colleges in Assam
Education in Jorhat district
Universities and colleges in Assam
Educational institutions established in 1927
1927 establishments in India